Jared Tyler Koenig (born January 24, 1994) is an American professional baseball pitcher in the San Diego Padres organization. He has played in Major League Baseball (MLB) for the Oakland Athletics.

Amateur career
Koenig grew up in Aptos, California, and attended Aptos High School.

Koenig began his college baseball career at Central Arizona College. He was selected in the 35th round of the 2014 Major League Baseball draft by the Chicago White Sox, but was not offered a contract by the team along with other late-round picks after signing first rounder Carlos Rodón to an above-slot signing bonus. After his sophomore season Koenig transferred to Old Dominion University. Koenig pitched for the Old Dominion Monarchs baseball team for one season before transferring to California State University, Monterey Bay to pitch for the Cal State Monterey Bay Otters for his senior season.

Professional career

Independent leagues
After going unselected in the 2016 Major League Baseball draft, Koenig signed Monterey Amberjacks of the independent Pecos League prior to the start of the 2017 season. He later pitched for Salina Stockade American Association of Professional Baseball before being traded to San Rafael Pacifics of the Pacific Association. Koenig also played for the Birmingham Bloomfield Beavers of the United Shore Professional Baseball League during the 2017 season.

Koenig returned to San Rafael in 2018 and was named the Pacific Association Pitcher of the Year after posting a 11–1 record with 3.54 ERA and 140 strikeouts in 16 starts. Koenig pitched for the Lake Erie Crushers of the Frontier League in 2019 and went 7–2 with a 2.24 ERA and 133 strikeouts in  innings pitched. Following the season, he signed to play for the Auckland Tuatara in the Australian Baseball League. While pitching for Auckland Koenig was noticed by Dan Betreen, an international scout for the Oakland Athletics.

Oakland Athletics
Koenig signed a minor league contract with the Oakland Athletics on December 21, 2019. He did not play in 2020 due to the cancellation of the Minor League Baseball season because of the COVID-19 pandemic. Koenig trained with his younger brother, a player at Cabrillo College, until taking part in Oakland's fall instructional league. He spent the 2021 with the Double-A Midland RockHounds and was named the Double-A Central Pitcher of the Year after going 7–5 with a 3.26 ERA and 100 strikeouts in  innings pitched. Koenig was assigned to the Triple-A Las Vegas Aviators at the start of the 2022 season.

On June 8, Koenig was selected to the 40-man roster and promoted to the major leagues for the first time. That same day, Koenig would make his Major League Baseball debut vs. the Atlanta Braves. In the second inning, he earned his first MLB strikeout on William Contreras. Despite pitching four innings of one run ball, the defending 2021 World Series champions would rally in the fifth, earning Koenig the loss.

Koenig’s third career start for the Oakland Athletics came on June 19, vs the Kansas City Royals where he would pitch 5 ⅔ innings of scoreless ball, earning him his first MLB win. Koenig finished his rookie campaign appearing in 10 games (5 starts), pitching to a 1-3 record and 5.72 ERA with 22 strikeouts in 39.1 innings of work. He was non-tendered and became a free agent on November 18, 2022.

San Diego Padres
On February 23, 2023, Koenig signed a minor league contract with the San Diego Padres organization.

References

External links

Central Arizona Vaqueros bio
Old Dominion Monarchs bio
Cal State Monterey Bay Otters bio

1994 births
Living people
Baseball players from San Jose, California
Major League Baseball pitchers
Oakland Athletics players
Central Arizona Vaqueros baseball players
Old Dominion Monarchs baseball players
Cal State Monterey Bay Otters baseball players
San Rafael Pacifics players
Auckland Tuatara players
Lake Erie Crushers players
Midland RockHounds players
Las Vegas Aviators players
Expatriate baseball players in New Zealand